("Springtime, how good and faithful you are"), WAB 58 is a lied composed by Anton Bruckner in 1856 on a text of Oskar von Redwitz.

History 
Bruckner composed the lied on five strophes of Oskar von Redwitz' . He dedicated the work to Friedrich Mayer, prelate of the St. Florian Abbey.

The lied was first published in 1902 by Max Marschalk in Die Musik, Band 1, No. 17. The first public performance occurred during a concert of the Wiener Akademischer Wagner-Verein on 5 February 1903 by Gisella Seehofer, who then also premiered Bruckner's Ave Maria, WAB 7 and Im April.

In 1930, a facsimile of it was published in Band III/2, pp. 184–188 of the Göllerich/Auer biography.

Text 

The song uses strophes 1, 2, 3, 8 & 9 of Oskar von Redwitz' Amaranths Waldeslieder.

Music 
The 102-bar long work in G major is scored for solo voice and piano.

Discography 
There are two recordings of Wie bist du Frühling, gut und treu:
 Robert Holzer (bass), Thomas Kerbl (piano), Anton Bruckner Lieder/Magnificat – CD: LIVA 046, 2011. NB: Transposed in E major.
 Elisabeth Wimmer (soprano), Daniel Linton-France (piano) in "Bruckner, Anton – Böck liest Bruckner I" – CD – Gramola 99195, 3 October 2018

References

Sources 
 August Göllerich, Anton Bruckner. Ein Lebens- und Schaffens-Bild,  – posthumous edited by Max Auer by G. Bosse, Regensburg, 1932
 Anton Bruckner – Sämtliche Werke, Band XXIII/1: Lieder für Gesang und Klavier (1851–1882), Musikwissenschaftlicher Verlag der Internationalen Bruckner-Gesellschaft, Angela Pachovsky (Editor), Vienna, 1997
 Cornelis van Zwol, Anton Bruckner 1824–1896 – Leven en werken, uitg. Thoth, Bussum, Netherlands, 2012. 
 Uwe Harten, Anton Bruckner. Ein Handbuch''. , Salzburg, 1996. .

External links 
 
 Amaranths Waldeslieder G-Dur, WAB 58 – Critical discography by Hans Roelofs 

Lieder by Anton Bruckner
1856 compositions
Compositions in G major